George Ward Nichols (June 21, 1831 - September 15, 1885) was an American journalist known as the creator of the legend of Wild Bill Hickok.

Biography
Nichols was born on June 21, 1831, in Tremont, Maine. During American Civil War he served under General John C. Fremont and General William Sherman. He wrote The Story of the Great March (1865). The book was translated on several languages.

In September 1865 Nichols arrived in Springfield, Missouri, where he met James Butler "Wild Bill" Hickok. The article Wild Bill by Nichols appeared in Harper’s New Monthly Magazine in February 1867. The publication immortalized Wild Bill. Kansas newspapers criticized Nichols for exaggerated exploits of the gunfighter.

Later Nichols moved to Cincinnati, where he became president of the Cincinnati College of Music. From 1868 until his death he was married to Maria Longworth Nichols Storer The couple had two children: Joseph and Margaret, wife of French politician Pierre de Chambrun. Nichols died from tuberculosis on September 15, 1885.

Works
 The Story of the Great March: From the Diary of a Staff Officer (1865).
 The Sanctuary: A Story of the Civil War (1866).
 Art Education Applied to Industry (1877).
 Pottery; How it is Made, Its Shape and Decoration (1878).
 The Cincinnati Organ: With a Brief Description of the Cincinnati Music Hall (1878).

References

Bibliography
 Rosa J. G. George Ward Nichols and the Legend of Wild Bill Hickok // Arizona and the West. Vol. 19, No.. 2, Summer, 1977. P. 135–162.
 Rosa J. G. They Called Him Wild Bill: The Life and Adventures of James Butler Hickok. University of Oklahoma Press. 2012.
 Thrapp D. L. Encyclopedia of Frontier Biography, Volume 2: G-O. University of Nebraska Press. 1991. P. 1054.

External links

 George Ward Nichols at Spartacus Educational.

1831 births
1885 deaths
19th-century American journalists
American male journalists
19th-century American male writers
19th-century deaths from tuberculosis
Tuberculosis deaths in Ohio